Trichophaea is a genus of fungi in the family Pyronemataceae. The genus was circumscribed in 1885 by French pharmacist Jean Louis Émile Boudier in 1885.

Species
Trichophaea abundans  (P.Karst.) Boud. 1907
Trichophaea affinis (Sacc.) Boud. 1907
Trichophaea albospadicea (Grev.) Boud. 1907
Trichophaea ampezzana  (Rehm) Svrcek 1974
Trichophaea amphidoxa (Rehm) Boud. 1907
Trichophaea arctica Dissing 1981
Trichophaea balnei (Starbäck) Boud. 1907
Trichophaea bulbocrinita (W. Phillips) Boud. 1907
Trichophaea bullata Kanouse 1958
Trichophaea contradicta (Seaver) H.J. Larsen 1980
Trichophaea cupulata D.C.Pant 1980
Trichophaea dolosa (O.Weberb.) Boud. 1907
Trichophaea donglingensis Zheng Wang 2001
Trichophaea fimbriata (Quél.) Gamundí 1967
Trichophaea geoporoides Korf & W.Y.Zhuang 1985
Trichophaea glareosa (Velen.) Waraitch 1977
Trichophaea gregaria (Rehm) Boud. 1907
Trichophaea hazslinskya  (Cooke) Boud. 1907
Trichophaea hemisphaerioides (Mouton) Graddon 1960
Trichophaea himalyaensis L.R.Batra 1961
Trichophaea hybrida (Sowerby) T.Schumach. 1988
Trichophaea laricina (Velen.) Svrcek 1977
Trichophaea lecothecioides (Rehm) Boud. 1907
Trichophaea livida (Schumach.) Boud. 1904
Trichophaea lojkaeana (Rehm) Boud. 1907
Trichophaea michiganensis Kanouse 1958
Trichophaea minuta (Cain) Korf 1973
Trichophaea mussooriensis (K.S.Thind, E.K.Cash & Sethi) L.R.Batra 1961
Trichophaea narkandensis K.S.Thind & S.C.Kaushal 1980
Trichophaea pallidibrunnea W.Y.Zhuang & Korf 1989
Trichophaea paraphysincrustata Donadini, M.Torre & Calonge 1988
Trichophaea pseudogregaria (Rick) Boud. 1907
Trichophaea radhanagarensis S.D.Patil & M.S.Patil 1984
Trichophaea rehmii (Jacz.) Boud. 1907
Trichophaea saccata (H.C.Evans) Korf 1973
Trichophaea salicina (Velen.) Svrcek 1977
Trichophaea sphagni (Bong.) Boud. 1907
Trichophaea subalpina Jamoni 1998
Trichophaea sublivida  (Sacc. & Speg.) Boud. 1907
Trichophaea thuringiaca Benkert 2010
Trichophaea tumidosa K.S. Thind & S.C.Kaushal 1980
Trichophaea variornata Korf & W.Y.Zhuang 1991
Trichophaea vernalis (Velen.) Svrcek 1977
Trichophaea woolhopeia (Cooke & W.Phillips) Boud. 1885

References

Pyronemataceae
Pezizales genera
Taxa named by Jean Louis Émile Boudier
Taxa described in 1885